Gilles-Gaston Granger (28 January 1920 – 24 August 2016) was a French philosopher.

Work

His works discuss the philosophy of logic, mathematics, human and social sciences, Aristotle, Jean Cavaillès, and Ludwig Wittgenstein. 

He produced the most authoritative French translation of Wittgenstein's Tractatus Logico-Philosophicus and published more than 150 scientific articles.

In 1968 he co-founded with Jules Vuillemin the journal L'Âge de la Science. He was president of the scientific committee of Jules Vuillemin's Archives.

Biography
Studied at École Normale Supérieure, Paris, France. Associate in philosophy, bachelor in mathematics, doctorate in philosophy.
1947–1953: Professor at the University of São Paulo, Brazil.
1953–1955: Associate professor at the Centre National de la Recherche Scientifique (CNRS).
1955–1962: Professor at the University of Rennes.
1962–1964: Director of the École Normale Supérieure d'Afrique Centrale, in Brazzaville, Republic of the Congo.
1964–1986: Professor at the Université de Provence, Aix-en-Provence, France.
1986: Professor at the Collège de France. Chair of Comparative Epistemology.
1990: Professor emeritus of the Collège de France.
2000: Invited professor at the Conservatoire National des Arts et Métiers.

Works
Méthodologie économique (PUF, 1955)
La raison (1955)
La mathématique sociale du marquis de Condorcet (PUF, 1956)
Pensée formelle et sciences de l'homme (Aubier, 1960)
Formal Thought and the Sciences of Man, translation by Alexander Rosenberg (Boston Studies in the Philosophy of Science, 1983)
Essai d'une philosophie du style (Armand Colin, 1968)
Wittgenstein (Seghers, 1969)
La théorie aristotélicienne de la science (Aubier, 1976)
Langage et épistémologie (Klincksieck, 1979)
Pour la connaissance philosophique (Odile Jacob, 1988)
Invitation à la lecture de Wittgenstein (Alinéa, 1990)
La vérification (Odile Jacob, 1992)
Le probable, le possible et le virtuel (Odile Jacob, 1995)
L'irrationnel (Odile Jacob, 1998)
La pensée de l'espace (Odile Jacob, 1999)

Notes and references

External links 
Gilles Gaston Granger. "La contradiction", Travaux du Centre de Recherches Sémiologiques, 57, p. 39–53, 1988 
Biography, list of works, on the site of the Collège de France 
Bibliographie 
Lacour, Philippe. Gilles-Gaston Granger et la critique de la raison symbolique 
Lacour, Philippe. Le concept d'''histoire dans la philosophie de Gilles-Gaston Granger'' 

1920 births
2016 deaths
Writers from Paris
École Normale Supérieure alumni
Academic staff of the University of Provence
Academic staff of the University of São Paulo
Academic staff of the University of Rennes
Academic staff of the Collège de France
Rationalists
Epistemologists
Wittgensteinian philosophers
Philosophers of science
20th-century French philosophers
French male writers